The Airframes Unlimited SS-2 Trainer is an American powered parachute that was designed and produced by Airframes Unlimited of Athens, Texas for the training role. Now out of production, when it was available the aircraft was supplied as a kit for amateur construction.

The SS-2 Trainer was introduced in 2003 and production had ended by the time the company went out of business in 2014.

Design and development
The SS-2 Trainer was designed to comply with the US Experimental - Amateur-built aircraft rules. It features a parachute-style wing, two-seats-in-side-by-side configuration, tricycle landing gear and a single  Rotax 582 engine in pusher configuration. The  Rotax 503 engine was optional, as was a single seat configuration.

The aircraft carriage is built from welded 4130 steel tubing. In flight steering is accomplished via foot pedals that actuate the canopy brakes, creating roll and yaw. On the ground the aircraft has lever-controlled nosewheel steering. The main landing gear incorporates spring rod suspension.

Operational history
In August 2015 eight examples were registered in the United States with the Federal Aviation Administration.

Specifications (SS-2 Trainer)

References

External links
Company website archives on Archive.org

SS-2
2000s United States sport aircraft
2000s United States ultralight aircraft
Single-engined pusher aircraft
Powered parachutes